is a Japanese gravure idol, represented by the talent agency Shining Production, formerly by FITONE. She is from Tokyo and strongly interested in a Japanese hard rock duo, B'z.

Her show-business name was simply Mikuru (未来), until May 2009.

Filmography

TV Programs 
 Rank Okoku (ランク王国), TBS 2007
 Dokidoki!? Newscaster #11 #12 (ドキドキ!? にゅ～すキャスター #11 #12), MONDO21 2008
 God Tongue ～The God Tongue Kami no Shita～ (ゴッドタン ～The God Tongue 神の舌～), TV Tokyo 2008
 Hisho no Kagami (秘書のカガミ), TV Tokyo 2008
 AKIBA-tteki!! (AKIBAッテキ!!), Enta!371 2008
 Touch Me Idol (タッチミーアイドル), STAR Karaoke, 2008
 Reader's How to Book (リーダー'S ハウ トゥ Book), TV Asahi 2008
 Geinokai Tokubetsu Jugyo! Watashi wa Koushite Ikinokori mashita! (芸能界特別授業! 私はこうして生き残りました!), TBS 2008
 Dospe 2 (ドスペ2), TV Asahi 2008
 Zenryoku-zaka (全力坂), TV Asahi 2009

V-Cinema 
 Kyodai Heroine Melodia (巨大ヒロイン メロディア), Zen-pictures 2008

Image DVD 
 Mikuru Naisho Ainyu G no Kofuku (未来 ナイショ 愛乳Gの幸福), C&H 2008
 Kyukyoku Otome Mikuru Uchino Pussy Cat (究極乙女 内野未来 Pussy Cat), Media Force 2009
 Kyukyoku Otome Mikuru Uchino Pretty Girl Lovely Days (究極乙女 内野未来 Pretty Girl Lovely Days), Media Force 2009
 Yawa-chichi (柔乳), Saibunkan Publishing 2010

Bibliography

Magazines 
 CAPA September 2008, pp. 147–153, Gakken 2008
 Nikon D700 Superbook (ニコン D700 スーパーブック), Gakken 2008

Digital photobooks 
 Mikuru Doga-tsuki Shashinshu (未来 動画付写真集), GIRLS TRAIN 2009
 Mikuru Didital Shashinshu "Nurse to Bikini no Gap" (未来 デジタル写真集 「ナースとビキニのギャップ」), ASPECT Didital Media

References

External links 
 Shining Production 
 Official Profile 
 Mikurouge (Powered by Ameba)  - Official Blog with her photographs, Since August 2009

1988 births
Living people
People from Tokyo
Japanese gravure models
Japanese television personalities